Anthony Kelly may refer to:

 Anthony Kelly (lacrosse) (born 1980), professional lacrosse player with the Los Angeles Riptide
 Anthony Paul Kelly (1897–1932), American screenwriter
 Anthony Kelly (academic), professor of education at the University of Southampton
 Anthony Kelly (martial artist) (born 1964), grandmaster martial artist and world record holder
 Champ Kelly, American football executive
 Anthony Kelly (materials scientist) (1929–2014) British materials scientist

See also
 Tony Kelly (disambiguation)
 Anthony-Noel Kelly (born 1956), British artist